The 2008 Australian Manufacturers' Championship was a CAMS sanctioned motor racing title for car manufacturers.
The championship, which was open to Group 3E Series Production Cars was the 23rd Australian Manufacturers' Championship.

Schedule
The title was contested concurrently with the 2008 Australian Production Car Championship over a four-round series.
 Round 1, Phillip Island Grand Prix Circuit, Victoria, 14–15 June
 Round 2, Oran Park Raceway, New South Wales, 30–31 August
 Round 3, Symmons Plains International Raceway, Tasmania, 19–20 September
 Round 4, Sandown International Motor Raceway, Victoria, 29–30 November

Rounds 1 & 4 were contested over two races and Rounds 2 & 3 over three races.

Classes
Cars competed in six classes:
 Class A: High Performance Vehicles All Wheel Drive (under $125k)
 Class B: High Performance Vehicles Rear Wheel Drive (under $125k)
 Class C: Hot Hatches and Sedans
 Class D: Production Sports
 Class E: Four Cylinder Sedans and Hatches
 Class F: Eco Diesel/Hybrid

Points
A manufacturer that had registered for the championship could specify up to two "nominated point scoring automobiles". Points were awarded for class placings achieved by these cars at each race on varying scales depending on the number of competitors in each class at each round.
 Where six or more cars attempted to qualify for a class, championship points were awarded on a 30–25–22–20–18–16–14–12–10–8 basis for the first ten finishers in that class in each race.
 Where four or five cars attempted to qualify for a class, championship points were awarded on a 25–20–16–12–10 basis for the first six finishers in the class in each race.
 Where one, two or three cars attempted to qualify for a class, championship points were awarded on a 20–14–10 basis for the first three finishers in the class in each race.
No points were awarded for outright race placings.

Results

References

Further reading
 Grant Rowley, Factory Fighter, The Annual – Number 4/2008, pages 116–117

External links
 Hyundai Wins 2008 Australian Manufacturers' Championship Archived at www.webcitation.org on 15 December 2009
 Race Results Archive – 2008
 Images from the 2008 CAMS Nationals race meetings including Australian Manufacturers Championship rounds
 2008 Group 3E Series Production Car Technical Regulations

Australian Manufacturers' Championship
Manufacturers' Championship